Gbanziri (Gbanzili) is a Ubangian language of the Central African Republic and Democratic Republic of the Congo.

References

Ngbaka languages
Languages of the Central African Republic
Languages of the Democratic Republic of the Congo